Pterisanthes is a vine plant genus in the subfamily Vitoideae.  Its native range is Indochina to W. Malesia including the Philippines.  The relationship between Pterisanthes and another genus "Nothocissus" with Ampelocissus has been debated, with the latter now subsumed within Ampelocissus, but with Pterisanthes retained.

Species 
Plants of the World Online currently includes:
 Pterisanthes beccariana Planch.
 Pterisanthes brevipedicellata Latiff
 Pterisanthes caudigera (Griff.) Planch.
 Pterisanthes cissioides Blume
 Pterisanthes dalhousiae Planch.
 Pterisanthes eriopoda (Miq.) Planch.
 Pterisanthes glabra Ridl.
 Pterisanthes grandis Ridl.
 Pterisanthes heterantha (Griff.) M.A.Lawson
 Pterisanthes miquelii Planch.
 Pterisanthes pedata M.A.Lawson
 Pterisanthes polita (Miq.) M.A.Lawson
 Pterisanthes pulchra Ridl.
 Pterisanthes quinquefoliolata Merr.
 Pterisanthes rufula (Miq.) Planch.
 Pterisanthes stonei Latiff
 Pterisanthes sumatrana Latiff

References

External links

Vitaceae genera
Vitaceae